Penicillium paxilli is an anamorph, saprophytic species of the genus Penicillium which produces paxilline, paxisterol, pyrenocine A,  paspaline B and verruculogene. Penicillium paxilli is used as a model to study the biochemistry of the indol-diterepene biosynthesis

Further reading

References 

paxilli
Fungi described in 1907